The Old River is a  stream located in southeastern New Hampshire in the United States. It is a tributary of the Taylor River, the primary tributary of the Hampton River estuary connected to the Atlantic Ocean.

The river's entire course is within Hampton, New Hampshire. It rises north of the center of town, in a wetland, and flows west, past the Interstate 95/NH 101 interchange at the Hampton tollbooths. The river continues southwest, passing through Car Barn Pond, and reaches the Taylor River upstream from Coffins Mill.

See also

List of rivers of New Hampshire

References

Rivers of New Hampshire
Rivers of Rockingham County, New Hampshire